Eastern Heights is a neighborhood within the district of East Tampa, which represents District 5 of the Tampa City Council. The 2000 census numbers are included with East Tampa. The latest estimated population was 192 and the population density was 2,730 people per square mile.

Geography
Eastern Heights boundaries are roughly 40th Street to the west, Chelsea Street to the north, and Lake Avenue to the south and east. The ZIP Code serving the neighborhood is 33610.

Education
Eastern Heights is served by Hillsborough County Public Schools, which serves the city of Tampa and Hillsborough County.

References

External links
Eastern Heights page
Information from city-data.com

Neighborhoods in Tampa, Florida